Finelli is an Italian surname. Notable people with the surname include:

Giuliano Finelli (1601–1653), Italian sculptor 
Renzo Finelli (born 1945), Italian middle distance runner

See also
Pinelli

Italian-language surnames